Saint Nicetius (Nicetus, Nicet or Nizier) (513 – 2 April 573) was Archbishop of Lyon, then Lugdunum, France, during the 6th century. He served from 552 or 553. He is venerated as a saint in the Catholic Church.

Life
Nicetius was descended from an ancient noble Gaulish family in Burgundy, and, by the care of virtuous parents, received a learned and pious education. He was ordained as a priest by Agricola, Bishop of Châlons-sur-Marne. Nicetius was the nephew of Sacerdos, bishop of Lyon, and his successor. He revived ecclesiastical chant in his diocese.

Nicetius was also noted for being an exorcist.  He received the title of patriarch from the pope. He took it upon himself to judge secular as well as ecclesiastical cases and therefore came into conflict with the local count. Nicetius attended a council at his own city of Lyon some time between 567 and 570.

Veneration
His feast day is 2 April, the day on which he died. Miracles were attributed to him after his death. The church of Saint-Nizier in Lyon is dedicated to him.   There is an early life of Nicetius which can be found in Vita Nicetii Episcopi Lugdunensis, ed. B. Krusch, Monumenta Germaniae Historica Scriptores Rerum Merovingicarum III pp. 518–524 and is translated online here Gregory of Tours - who refers to Nicetius as his uncle- also wrote a supplementary life to him in his Vita Patrum.

References

External links 
 Nicetius
 Les ancêtres de Charlemagne, 1989, Christian Settipani

513 births
573 deaths
6th-century Burgundian bishops
Archbishops of Lyon
6th-century Frankish saints